Senator Blue may refer to:

Dan Blue (born 1949), North Carolina State Senate
Richard W. Blue (1841–1907), Kansas State Senate